Hyperwords or liquid information refers to text that can be sent to programs or services (such as emails, dictionaries, online translators) through a simple set of commands. It is a selection-based interface which can be used for references, searches, blogging, emailing, copying, conversions and language translation.

The project grew out of a research project at University College London. It was taken on by The Hyperwords Company, renamed to The Liquid Information Company in 2012, where it was then developed and maintained from its London, UK offices until its dissolution in 2014. Frode Hegland was the head of the company. The original development of Liquid (OS X) was by Daoxin Z. in China, followed by Konstantin R. (TIANI Studio) in Poland and Zuzex in Russia.

The company's advisory board included Douglas Engelbart, Ted Nelson, Vint Cerf, Dave Farber, Bruce Horn and Douglas Rushkoff.

Browser extensions
The concept has been implemented as a server plug-in and as a plug-in for the Firefox, Flock, Chrome and Safari web browsers.

Liquid Browser
The Liquid Browser add-ons for Firefox, Chrome, and Safari were developed by Mikhail S. and Alex V. in Russia, and Tobias H. in Germany, until it was discontinued.

References

Hypertext
Nonfree Firefox legacy extensions
2006 software